Bonegilla House is a heritage-listed house at 587 Kiewa Street, Albury, City of Albury, New South Wales, Australia. It is also known as Grace-evelyn Lodge. It was added to the New South Wales State Heritage Register on 2 April 1999.

History

Description

Heritage listing 

Bonegilla House was listed on the New South Wales State Heritage Register on 2 April 1999. It was described as a good example of mid-Victorian architecture and part of a corner group.

See also

References

Attribution 

New South Wales State Heritage Register
Albury, New South Wales
Houses in New South Wales
Articles incorporating text from the New South Wales State Heritage Register